Gymnastics competitions at the 2018 Commonwealth Games in the Gold Coast, Australia, were held from April 5 to 9, 2018 (artistic) and 11 to 13 (rhythmic) at the Coomera Indoor Sports Centre.  A total of 14 artistic gymnastics events were held (eight for men and six for women), along with six rhythmic gymnastics events.

Schedule

Medal table

Medal summary

Artistic

Men's events

Women's events

Rhythmic

Participating nations

Artistic
There are 21 participating nations in the artistic gymnastics competitions with a total of 98 athletes.

Rhythmic
There are 13 participating nations in the rhythmic gymnastics competitions with a total of 26 athletes. Nigeria and Sri Lanka made their Commonwealth Games debut in the sport.

See also
Gymnastics at the 2018 Summer Youth Olympics

References

External links
 Results Book – Gymnastics – Artistic
 Results Book – Gymnastics – Rhythmic

 
2018 Commonwealth Games events
Commonwealth
2018
International gymnastics competitions hosted by Australia